Specklinia schaferi is a species of orchid plant native to the Dominican Republic, Haiti, and Cuba.

References 

schaferi
Flora of the Dominican Republic
Flora of Cuba
Flora of Haiti
Flora without expected TNC conservation status